José Benlliure y Gil (30 September 1858, Valencia – 5 April 1937, Valencia) was a Spanish painter.

Life
He was born at Cañamelar, Valencia, studied painting under Francisco Domingo Marqués, and showed from the first such marked talent that he was sent to the Spanish school in Rome.
From 1903 to 1913, he was director of the Spanish Academy of Fine Arts.

He was one of the select circle pensioned by the Spanish government for residence in Italy and executed several state orders for the decoration of public buildings; but he owes his chief fame to his large historical paintings, notably the "Vision in the Coliseum." He became the leader of the Spanish art colony in Rome, where he practised as painter and sculptor. 

He married Maria Ortiz in 1880, after establishing his residence in Rome. In Italy he painted small genre paintings, and began in the city of Assisi on the View of the Coliseum (now in the Museum of Fine Arts in Valencia), a painting he won a first prize in the National exhibition of 1887, together with his brother, the sculptor Mariano Benlliure, who presented the award-winning sculpture of the painter Josep de Ribera.
 
Benlliure obtained several successes in Paris, Munich, Stuttgart and Berlin with his paintings. In 1903 he assumed leadership of the Spanish Academy in Rome, succeeding his brother Marian, a position he would keep for ten years.
 
He was also the father of painter Josep Benlliure i Ortiz, known as Peppino, who was born in Rome in 1884. In late 1919 he offered a tribute to Rome with an exhibition of 45 paintings in Madrid in the halls of the Theatre Royal. When he returned to Valencia he was appointed as honorary president of the Circle of Fine Arts in Valencia (Cercle de Belles Arts), and became director of the Museu de Belles Arts de Valencia, a position he held until 1924. He  received the Grand Cross of the Crown of Italy and the Cross of Officer of the Legion of Honor from the French government.

In 1957, the painter's daughter, Maria Benlliure Ortiz gave the City of Valencia, the family house where her father and his family lived and worked, along with a number of his paintings, his son's paintings family photographs, and paintings by Munoz Degrain, Rusinyol, family friend Joaquin Sorolla, and others.   The museum also provides access to the house's garden and a studio that Benlliure y Gil had created for his son, Joseph Benlliure y Ortiz who died in 1916. The painter's wife, Maria Ortiz Fullana died in 1918.   The museum, House Museum Benlliure, is operated by the city of Valencia as a public museum.

Jose Benlliure y Gil's brothers  and Mariano were also a painter and a sculptor, respectively.

Gallery

References

Attribution

1858 births
1937 deaths
People from Valencia
Painters from the Valencian Community
19th-century Spanish painters
Spanish male painters
20th-century Spanish painters
Sculptors from the Valencian Community
20th-century Spanish sculptors
20th-century Spanish male artists
19th-century Spanish sculptors
19th-century Spanish male artists
Spanish male sculptors
Orientalist painters